Star Trek is a comic book series by IDW Publishing, based on the Star Trek science fiction entertainment franchise created by Gene Roddenberry. Since 2007, IDW Publishing has released three Star Trek ongoing series along with many limited series, crossover series and annuals.

Publication history

2006–2010 
On November 9, 2006, IDW Publishing announced that they had secured the publishing rights to Star Trek from CBS Consumer Products.

IDW's first title, Star Trek: The Next Generation: The Space Between, is a six-issue limited series launched January 2007. The Space Between is written by David Tischman and drawn by Casey Maloney.<ref>{{cite news|title=Star Trek Returns With All-New Comics Voyages|date=December 2006|publisher=IDW Publishing|work=Spike: Asylum #4}}</ref> This storyline was collected in trade paperback form in September 2007.

The second series Star Trek: Klingons: Blood Will Tell, launched in April, focusing on the Klingons' point of view on various episodes from the original series - the first four issues based around "Errand of Mercy", "The Trouble with Tribbles", "A Private Little War" and "Day of the Dove", respectively, and features a framing story based around the events of Star Trek VI: The Undiscovered Country.

A third series started in July 2007, called Star Trek: Year Four, continuing the five-year mission of Kirk's Enterprise after the end of Star Trek: The Original Series. A fourth series, Alien Spotlight launched in September 2007, focusing on various alien races.

2008 saw the publication of the "Mirror Images" series, which tell the stories of Mirror Universe Kirk's overthrow of Captain Christopher Pike, and of the alternates of the Enterprise-D crew. In the same year they published Star Trek: Assignment: Earth, a mini-series that features the adventures of Gary Seven from the Star Trek TOS episode Assignment: Earth.

In 2009, IDW began to publish their first Star Trek: Deep Space Nine comic, the four-part Fool's Gold.

Also, in 2009, IDW published a prequel to the 2009 reboot/prequel film Star Trek, entitled Star Trek: Countdown.

In 2009, IDW published Star Trek II: The Wrath of Khan, written by Andy Schmidt and based on the second Star Trek movie, and the only movie that has never been in comic form from the Original Crew.

Other recent series include Star Trek: Crew, Star Trek: Romulans, Pawns of War and Star Trek: Doctor McCoy, Frontier Doctor.

 2011–2021 

 2009 film continuity 
In September 2011, IDW began publishing a new ongoing Star Trek series, set in the continuity of the 2009 Star Trek film. This series ran for 60 issues and concluded in 2016.

In January 2013, IDW began publishing Star Trek: Countdown to Darkness, a prequel to the film Star Trek Into Darkness (2013). Later that year, in October, they began publishing Star Trek: Khan, another tie-in, focusing on the film's antagonist Khan Noonien Singh.

A new ongoing, titled Star Trek: Boldly Go, was launched in 2016 and continues with the status quo established by the film Star Trek Beyond (2016). The series explored new situations such as "Kirk, McCoy, Sulu, and Chekov [transferring] over to the USS Endeavor, while Spock and Uhura settled on New Vulcan. Meanwhile, Scotty became an instructor at Starfleet Academy, with Jaylah as a student". The Borg were a reoccurring villain in the series and the last arc dealt with "multiversal chaos" which brought "together the Enterprise crews from several different realities". The series ran for 18 issues and concluded in 2018.

 Original continuity 
In September 2012, IDW began a four-issue miniseries "Star Trek: The Next Generation - HIVE" about the return of Locutus of Borg.

In 2014, IDW worked with Harlan Ellison to publish a graphic novel based on his original screenplay for "The City on the Edge of Forever".

To coincide with the launch of Star Trek: Discovery, IDW published a 4-issue prequel series in 2018 entitled "The Light of Kahless," chronicling T'Kuvma's backstory and rise to Klingon warrior. Star Trek: Discovery Annual #1 recounted the first meeting between Lt. Paul Stamets and Dr. Culber – the first openly gay couple on Star Trek.

A new ongoing, titled Star Trek: Year Five, was launched in 2019 and continues the story of the Kirk's Enterprise from Star Trek: Year Four. The Hollywood Reporter commented that "the series will be written by a rotating team of talent, with a writer’s room made up of Brandon Easton, Jody Houser, Jim McCann and the team of Collin Kelly and Jackson Lanzing". The series concluded with issue #25 in 2021. Jared Mason Murray, for Screen Rant, highlighted that the creative team "have rendered what feels like the most accurate spiritual continuation of the beloved sci-fi television show. [...] Star Trek: Year Five is a worthy entry into the Star Trek mythos and will finally make sense of years of continuity confusion". Jamie Lovett, for ComicBook.com, highlighted the "near-anthology" and episodic format of series with a rotating creative team with change as the "overarching theme". Lovett wrote that "the writing has focused on showing how the characters from The Original Series became the changed character who returned for the Star Trek movies. [...] Star Trek: Year Five is a remarkable achievement for a licensed comic. Often, these titles have little new or exciting to offer fans of their source material and even less for those who aren't familiar, ultimately feeling redundant or vestigial. Star Trek: Year Five is neither. It set out on a mission to tell an essential missing chapter in the lives of these characters, and it succeeded".

 Mirror Universe 
From 2017 to 2018, IDW published three limited series set in the Mirror Universe: Mirror Broken (2017), Through the Mirror (2018), and Terra Incognita (2018). These series focused on Jean-Luc Picard and the crew of the ISS Enterprise. Mirror Broken was included on Screen Rant's 2022 "The 10 Best Star Trek Comics" list — the article states "one of the strengths of the miniseries is its ability to impart a lot of information in a digestible and fun-to-read manner. [...] Though the story isn't as fleshed out as other miniseries, it is still a fascinating glimpse into the mirror universe".

A new limited series, entitled Mirror War, was first published in 2021. It is a thirteen part continuation of the 2017–2018 Mirror Universe saga. It follows Picard's ongoing galactic conquest which draws the attention of the Klingon-Cardassian Alliance. It will also have several issues which follow individual members of the ISS Enterprise crew.

 2022–present 
Along with the continued publication of Mirror War (2021), IDW published two anthologies in 2022 — the relaunched Alien Spotlight series and Adventures in the 32nd Century (a Star Trek: Discovery tie-in) series. IDW also released The Mirror Universe Saga trade paperback, a reprint of a 1980s DC Comics run set in the Mirror Universe.

 Crossovers 
In 2012, IDW published a six-issue limited series crossover featuring the Legion of Super-Heroes from DC Comics. This was followed soon after by the first-ever licensed crossover between the Star Trek franchise and Doctor Who. It was an eight-issue limited series titled Star Trek: The Next Generation/Doctor Who: Assimilation². These were the first of numerous crossover storylines featuring Star Trek characters interacting with characters from various franchises.

In June 2018, it was announced that there will be a Star Trek and Transformers crossover released in September titled Star Trek vs. Transformers.

Collected editions
The various series have been collected in trade paperbacks.
 Ongoing series 

 Star Trek (2013–2016) 
Flagship series that ran for sixty issues, from 2011 to 2016. The series was marketed as Star Trek: Ongoing to differentiate it from other series.

 Boldly Go (2016–2018) Star Trek: Boldly Go series depicts events between the conclusion of Star Trek Beyond (2016) and the launch of the newly built .

 Star Trek: Year Five (2019–2021) 
Continues the story of Kirk's Enterprise from the mini-series Star Trek: Year Four (2007).

 Limited series 

 The Next Generation (2007–2013) 
Comics based on Star Trek: The Next Generation.

 Klingons: Blood Will Tell (2007) Star Trek: KlingonsBlood Will Tell miniseries explores prominent events in Star Trek history from a Klingon perspective.

 Star Trek: The Original Series (2007–2014) 
Comics based on Star Trek: The Original Series.

 Romulans: Pawns of War (2008–2010) Star Trek: RomulansPawns of War, by John Byrne, depict the lives of Romulan military officers. Originally released as two series, Hollow Crown (2008) and Schisms (2009). Both were collected in Pawns of War (2010), which included a special issue, Balance of Terror, an adaptation of the episode of the same name as told from the Romulan perspective.

 New Frontier: Turnaround (2008) Star Trek: New FrontierTurnaround is a five-part miniseries written by Peter David.

 Deep Space Nine (2009–2010) 
Comics based on Star Trek: Deep Space Nine.

 Kelvin Universe (2009–2016) 
Comics based on Star Trek (2009), and its sequel films: Into Darkness (2013) and Beyond (2016). Marketed as part of the "Kelvin Universe" or "Kelvin Timeline". 

 New Visions (2013–2019) Star Trek: New Visions series that utilized imagery from the Original Series to create original stories. Stills from episodes were manipulated using modern photo editing software tools and effects. Written by John Byrne.

 City on the Edge of Forever (2014) Star Trek: Harlan Ellison The City on the Edge of ForeverThe Original Teleplay is a commemorative miniseries which adapts the titular television episode script as originally written by Harlan Ellison.

 Discovery (2017–2018) Star Trek: Discovery is a series based on the television series of the same name.

 The Q Conflict (2019)
Crossover between, The Original Series, The Next Generation, Deep Space Nine, and Voyager.
 Mirror Universe Collection (2017–2019)
The three limited series –  Mirror Broken (2017), Through the Mirror (2018), and Terra Incognita (2018) – focus on Jean-Luc Picard and the crew of the ISS Enterprise in the Mirror Universe. An omnibus collecting the three series was later released in 2021.

 Voyager (2020–2021) 
Comics based on Voyger.
{| class="wikitable"
!Issue(s)
!Date
!Collection
!Date
!ISBN
|-
|1|
|rowspan="4"|Star Trek: Voyager - Seven's Reckoning
|rowspan="4"|
| rowspan="4" |
|-
|2
|
|-
|3
|
|-
|4
|
|}

The Mirror War (2021–2022) 
Star Trek: The Mirror War continues the story of Mirror Universe's Jean-Luc Picard and the crew of the ISS Enterprise; set after the previous mini-series Mirror Broken (2017), Through the Mirror (2018), and Terra Incognita (2018). The series is scheduled to have eight issues with an additional four tie-in specials focused individual crew members.

Anthologies

Alien Spotlight (2007–2010) 
Star Trek: Alien Spotlight series collects issues featuring popular species from the Star Trek universe.

Captain's Log (2010) 
Star Trek: Captain's Log is a four-issue anthology series, spanning multiple eras.

Waypoint (2016–2019) 
Star Trek: Waypoint is a six-issue anthology series, spanning multiple eras. Two one-shot, special issues have also been published.

Aliens (2022) 
The Alien Spotlight series was relaunched in 2022.

Discovery – Adventures in the 32nd Century (2022) 
Each issue of Star Trek: Discovery – Adventures in the 32nd Century focuses on different member of the Discovery crew adjusting to the 32nd Century.

Reprints, specials and other collections

Special issues (2008–2020)

Star Trek Omnibus (2009–2012) 
Omnibus collections of back issues, including issues from past licensees.

Infestation (2011) 
Infestation is a multi-franchise crossover series depicting a zombie invasion from the CVO: Covert Vampiric Operations universe of The Transformers, G.I. Joe, and Ghostbusters universes. Star Trek characters and settings appear in several issues.

The Newspaper Comics (2012–13) 
Star Trek: The Newspaper Comics collects the Los Angeles Times Syndicate strips.

Classic UK Comics (2016–17) 
Star Trek: The Classic UK Comics collects the two-page issues originally published in UK comics magazines Joe 90: Top Secret and TV21 from 1967 to 1969.

The Mirror Universe Saga 
A reprint collection of a 1980s DC Comics story arc which picks up after Star Trek III: The Search for Spock. Admiral Kirk and the crew of the U.S.S. Enterprise clash with their evil doppelgangers from the Mirror Universe.

Notes

References

Idw
IDW Publishing titles